Ashfield Arena is a sporting ground located in Ashfield, a northeastern suburb of Perth, Western Australia.

It is the home ground of Football West State League Division One side Ashfield Sports Club

Perth Glory Women

It became the home ground of the Perth Glory FC women's team from the 2014 season onwards.

Perth Glory Youth

Similarly, the Perth Glory Youth team have played their home games there for the National Premier Leagues WA and the National Youth League (Australia) competitions since the 2015–16 National Youth League season.

Home of Football

In 2016 Ashfield Reserve was named as the preferred site for the State Football Centre.

The Department of Sport and Recreation part funded the development of the Business Case, which was completed in January 2015. Ashfield Reserve, the current home of All Flags State League side Ashfield Sports Club, was considered the most suitable option.
“Football West will work closely with local, State and Commonwealth governments, as well as other stakeholders, to ensure the best possible outcome for the sport and the Ashfield Reserve precinct,” Twigger said.
Football West Chief Executive Officer James Curtis said the facility would serve football's needs as well as contributing greatly to the local community and the city's growing eastern corridor.
“The location is easily accessible, given its proximity to the Perth Stadium, Perth CBD, Tonkin and Roe Highways, the Perth Airport and the adjacent Ashfield Train Station,” Curtis said.

References

Soccer venues in Perth, Western Australia
A-League Women stadiums
Ashfield, Western Australia